Ralph Ramsey (died 1419), of Great Yarmouth and West Somerton, Norfolk and Kenton, Suffolk, was an English Member of Parliament for Great Yarmouth 1385, 1386, February 1388, September 1388, January 1390, 1391, 1395 and September 1397 and for Suffolk in 1402.

References

14th-century births
1419 deaths
People from Great Yarmouth
Politicians from Suffolk
14th-century English people
15th-century English people
Date of death unknown
Place of death missing
English MPs 1385
English MPs 1386
English MPs February 1388
English MPs September 1388
English MPs January 1390
English MPs 1391
English MPs 1395
English MPs September 1397
English MPs 1402